The Vorstenlanden (Dutch for 'princely lands' or 'princely states') were four native, princely states on the island of Java in the colonial Dutch East Indies. They were nominally self-governing vassals under suzerainty of the Kingdom of the Netherlands. Their political autonomy however became increasingly constrained by severe treaties and settlements. Two of these continue to exist as a princely territory within the current independent republic of Indonesia.

The four Javanese princely states were: 
 Surakarta, a sunanate to the north 
 Yogyakarta, the sultanate to the south
 Mangkunegaran, a duchy to the east
 Pakualaman, a small duchy largely enclosed within the area of the Sultanate of Yogyakarta
These princely territories were successor states to the Mataram Sultanate and originated in civil wars and wars of succession within the Javanese nobility. The susuhunan of Surakarta represented the direct line of succession; the other three rulers represented cadet branches.

History
When Mataram was not yet divided, the Dutch Colonial called the area under its control as Bovenlanden. Then, the Treaty of Giyanti was held in 1755 which divided Mataram into two, namely Surakarta and Yogyakarta with their respective territories and the Great State (Negara Agung) which was governed jointly.  At that time, its area stretched from present-day Cilacap to around Mount Kelud in East Java. After the Third Javanese War of Succession and the treaty was ratified, the Sultanate of Mataram split into the Surakarta Sunanate and the Yogyakarta Sultanate (contemporaneous Dutch spelling: Djokjakarta); Duchy of Mangkunegaran split from Surakarta in 1757. Lastly, Duchy of Pakualaman split off from Yogyakarta in 1812 after the Invasion of Java (1811).

The native rulers were formally considered 'autocrats' by the colonial authorities and all land in their territories was considered their property. Yet they did not have jurisdiction over Europeans and 'non-indigenous Orientals' and most native law courts were eventually replaced by Dutch colonial ones. The colonial government also assumed authority in other areas; the princely territories did not have their own postal services, for instance. Dutch colonial administrators assumed the role of 'older brother' to the native princes, a relationship which was ritually symbolised by native princes taking the right arm of Dutch residents and governors during public ceremonies. The native rulers were styled as Princely Highness by the Dutch authorities.  Like the particuliere landerijen [private domains], the princely states were not directly controlled by the colonial government, and so were not subjected to the notorious Cultivation System, introduced by Governor-General Johannes van den Bosch in 1830.

Modern day

Sultanate of Yogyakarta and Duchy of Pakualaman
The Sultanate of Yogyakarta is the only princely land which retains a special status within the current Republic of Indonesia, namely as daerah istimewa (special region). The former princely land of Pakualaman is administered as part of current Yogyakarta. The Sultan of Yogyakarta and the Duke of Pakualaman are also hold political statuses as Governor and Deputy Governor of Special Region of Yogyakarta which will last for lifetime, not five years unlike any other provinces in Indonesia even though they are still hold election for formality every five years but only one candidate pair, the Sultan and the Duke themselves. That is why Yogyakarta is the only province in Indonesia that have hereditary governor.

Sunanate of Surakarta and Duchy of Mangkunegaran
Although the Sunanate of Surakarta and Duchy of Mangkunegaran were merged into the province of Central Java after independence, the traditional monarchs are still exist and not abolished. However, they do not have any political and governmental powers but are rather cultural and ceremonial figure heads that have high influence in Javanese culture conservations and developments. Meanwhile, the political powers are held by the Mayor and Deputy Mayor of Surakarta.

See also 

 Indian honorifics, Filipino, Indonesian, Malay and Thai titles originated from these
 Greater India
 Indosphere
 List of Indonesian monarchies
 Princely state
 Principality

References 

Precolonial states of Indonesia